Feather Mountain is a 1951 picture book written and illustrated by Elizabeth Olds. Birds without any feathers must journey to feather mountain in order to get the plumage. The book was a recipient of a 1952 Caldecott Honor for its illustrations.

References

1951 children's books
American picture books
Caldecott Honor-winning works